Scopula anisopleura is a moth of the family Geometridae. It was described by Hiroshi Inoue in 1982. It is endemic to Japan.

References

Moths described in 1982
anisopleura
Moths of Japan
Taxa named by Hiroshi Inoue